Turi Turini (Aymara turi tower, the reduplication indicates that there is a group of something, -ni a suffix to indicate ownership, "the one with a group of towers", also spelled Turri Turruini) is a mountain in the La Paz Department in the Andes of Bolivia which reaches a height of approximately . It is located in the Loayza Province, Malla Municipality, southwest of Mallachuma. Turi Turini lies northeast of T'ula T'ulani.

References 

Mountains of La Paz Department (Bolivia)